William Slingsby was a soldier.

William Slingsby may also refer to:
William Cecil Slingsby, English mountain climber and alpine explorer
William Slingsby (MP) for Bodmin (UK Parliament constituency)